Kaviraj (or Rajkavi, Kaviraja) is a title of honor, which was given to poets and litterateurs attached to royal courts in medieval India. Eminent Charans who were inducted into the royal courts due to their literary merit as royal poets and historians were given the rank of Kaviraja (King of Poets). Such Charans assumed positions of great influence in the medieval polity. Few well known people are Kaviraja Shyamaldas, Kaviraja Bankidas, etc. The descendants of such persons also started using the surname, Kaviraj.  

The surname is usually found in people of Gujarat, Rajasthan, etc. One of the community where this surname is often found is Charan, who were the State poets & historians in the Rajput kingdoms of these regions.

Notable people 
 Kaviraja Bankidas Ashiya
 Krishnadasa Kaviraja
 Kaviraj Shyamaldas

See also 
 Barhath
 Gadhavi
 Rashtrakavi (disambiguation)
 Yug Charan
 Poet Laurette

Kabiraj

References

Surnames
Indian surnames
Indian words and phrases
Titles in India
Men's social titles
Cultural history of India
Linguistic history of India
Charan